Ain Harcha (or Ain Hircha) is a village situated in the Rashaya District and south of the Beqaa Governorate in Lebanon. It is located east of Mount Hermon close to the Syrian border south of Dahr El Ahmar. There it is a roman temple.

The village sits ca.  above sea level and the name is claimed in Aramaic to mean "house of spirits" or "place of worship" with some seeing this as derived from "the feast of sorceries" due to local folklore suggesting an evil spirit of Ain Al-Horsh inhabits the springs of Lebanon.

History
In 1838, Eli Smith noted  'Ain Harshy's population as being Druze and Christians.

Roman temple
 (about a forty-minute walk) along a rocky path, on a ridge-top to the west,  higher than the village sits one of the best examples of a Roman temple in the vicinity of Mount Hermon. The temple of Ain Harcha can also be reached by walking down from the village of Ain Ata. It was restored in 1938-1939 and dates, based on a Greek inscription on one of the blocks, to 114-115 AD. The temple is built of limestone, opens to the east and blends in with the landscape. The pediment and west wall are in particularly good condition and two columns bases show what supported the beams and roof. Carved blocks show busts of Selene, the moon goddess and Helios, the sun god. Around the site are remnants of ancient habitations and tombs.

References

Bibliography

External links

Ain Horcheh, localiban
 Panoramio - Images of Ain Harcha Roman Temple
 Lebanon Tourism - Ain Harcha Roman Temple Details
 The Lebanon Mountain Trail Project

Populated places in Rashaya District
Ancient Roman temples
Archaeological sites in Lebanon